Notommata is a genus of rotifers belonging to the family Notommatidae.

The genus has almost cosmopolitan distribution.

Species:
 Notommata aethis Myers, 1933 
 Notommata allantois Wulfert, 1935

References

Rotifer genera
Ploima